Ország, Orszag is a Hungarian surname. Notable people with the surname include: 

Jonathan Orszag (born 1973), American economist
Lili Ország (1926–1978), Hungarian painter
Peter R. Orszag (born 1968), American economist
Steven Orszag (1943–2011), American mathematician

Hungarian-language surnames